Howard Hoffman "Howdy" Groskloss (April 10, 1906 – July 15, 2006) was an American professional baseball player. He played all or part of three seasons in Major League Baseball for the Pittsburgh Pirates (1930–32), primarily as a second baseman. Groskloss batted and threw right-handed.

Early life and career
Born in Pittsburgh, Pennsylvania, the son of an opera singer, Groskloss attended Riverside Junior High School, Langley High School and The Kiski School, then spent one year at Washington & Jefferson College before transferring to Amherst College, graduating in 1930. He later attended the Yale School of Medicine while playing for the Pirates. In 1937, Groskloss became a doctor and practiced as a gynecologist in Miami, Florida for more than 25 years. He also was a flight surgeon in the Navy during World War II.

Groskloss was 24 years old when he broke into the big leagues with Pittsburgh. Among his teammates were Pie Traynor, Arky Vaughan, Gus Suhr, and the brothers Lloyd and Paul Waner. In a three-season career, Groskloss posted a .261 batting average with 21 RBI and 14 runs in 72 games.

Groskloss died in Vero Beach, Florida, at the age of 100. At the time of his death, he was recognized as the oldest living former major league player. He was buried at Woodlawn Cemetery in Miami, Florida.

Membership
Diplomat, American College of Obstetrics and Gynecology (ACOG)
Fellow, American College of Surgeons (ACS)
International College of Surgeons (ICS)

See also
List of centenarians (Major League Baseball players)
List of centenarians (sportspeople)

References

Further reading
 Gazette Times staff (January 17, 1916). "The Death Roll: Jacob A. Groskloss". The Gazette Times. p.  8
 'The Junior Reporter' (August 5, 1923). "Camp Porter Overnight Hikers See Ashtabula; Meet Is Complete Success; Big Show; Here You Are—The Big Meet". The Pittsburgh Press. p. 13
 Press staff (September 2, 1923). "Feature Baseball Game". p. 24
 Post-Gazette staff (April 24, 1926). "Groskloss, Local Boy, To Captain Kiski Nine". Pittsburgh Post-Gazette. p. 12
 Globe staff (November 17, 1928). "Two Backs on Whom Amherst Counts in Williams Clash". The Boston Globe. p. 9
 Wertenbach, Fred (July 6, 1931). "Mother Looks On as Youthful 'Howdy' Groskloss Stars". The Pittsburgh Press. p. 27
 Associated Press (August 14, 1931). "Howard Grosskloss Destined to Be Star in Big Leagues, Says Ens; Trick Knee Is Worry; Was Model Student". Fort Worth Star-Telegram. p. 11
 Sun-Telegraph staff (July 2, 1935). "'Howdy's' Secret with Cupid Out; Ex-Pirate, Nurse Eloped in East 3 Years Ago". Pittsburgh Sun-Telegraph. p. 3
 Kurtz, Paul (January 21, 1939). "Sports Stew—Served Hot". The Pittsburgh Press. p. 8
 Long, Phil (October 27, 1996). "Florida Journal: A Golden Glove — on field, in delivery room; The World Series ignites memories for noted physician". The Miami Herald. p. 6B

External links

Photos and memorial
Who's Alive and Who's Dead
Article from Amherst College when Howdy turned 100 in 2006
Image of Howdy and his baseball stats
100 winning years for oldest Buc from Pittsburgh Post-Gazette
The Baseball Record
Another short biography

Major League Baseball second basemen
Pittsburgh Pirates players
Williamsport Grays players
Tulsa Oilers (baseball) players
Jersey City Skeeters players
Amherst Mammoths baseball players
Amherst Mammoths football players
Washington & Jefferson College alumni
Yale University alumni
Baseball players from Pittsburgh
American centenarians
Men centenarians
1906 births
2006 deaths